Ernst August Hellmuth von Kiesenwetter (5 November 1820 Dresden – 18 March 1880 in Dresden) was a German entomologist who specialised in beetles.

Kiesenwetter’s Coleoptera collection is in the Museum of Natural History, Munich and his Hymenoptera and Heteroptera are in Staatliches Museum für Tierkunde Dresden.

Works
Kiesenwetter's works include:

1857 Naturgeschichte der Insecten Deutschlands, Coleoptera 4(1):1-176.
1857 Bemerkungen über Lacordaires Buprestiden-System. Berliner Entomologische Zeitschrift1:169-171.
1858. Beiträge zur Käferfauna Griechenlands. Stück 4 (Parnidae, Heteroceridae, Lamellicornia, Buprestidae). Berliner Entomologische Zeitschrift 2:231-249.
1859. Anthaxia plicata, p. 58. In: H. Schaum, Beiträge zur europäischen Käfer. Berliner Entomologische Zeitschrift 3:42-59.
1859. Synonymische Bemerkungen. Berliner Entomologische Zeitschrift 3:91-92.
1870 en la Península Ibérica (Coleoptera, Hydrochidae). Boln Asoc. esp. Ent. 22(1/2): 145-149. 1998
1874. Die malocodermen Japans nach dem Ergebnisse der Sammlungen des Herrn. G. Lewis während der Jahre 1869-1871. Berliner Entomol. Zeitschrift, 18: 241-288 
1874. Synonymische Bemerkungen. Berliner Entomologische Zeitschrift 18:440-441.
1877 with T.Kirsch  Die Käferfauna der Aukland-Inseln, nach Herm. Krone's Sammlungen beschrieben. Deutsche Entomologische Zeitschrift 21: 153-174. 
1879. Neue Amur-Käfer. Deutsche Entomologische Zeitschrift 23(1):145-146.
1879. Coleoptera Japoniae collecta a Domino Lewis et aliis. Deut. Entomol. Z. 23: 305-320.
1880 with T.Kirsch. Neue Anthaxia-Arten. Entomologische Monatsblätter 19:129-133.

References

Anon 1880: [Biographien]  Zool. Anz. 3:216
Anon 1880: [Kiesenwetter, E. A. H. von] Amer. Natural. 14:468
Anon 1880: [Kiesenwetter, E. A. H. von] Entomologist's Monthly Magazine (3) 16(1879–80):250

External links
 

German entomologists
1820 births
1880 deaths